The men's team revolver and pistol competition was one of 15 shooting sports events on the Shooting at the 1908 Summer Olympics programme. It was held on 11 July. There were 28 competitors from 7 nations, with each nation sending a team of four. The event was won by the United States in the nation's debut in the event. All three teams on the podium were new; Great Britain (bronze) was also making its debut, while Belgium (silver) had finished fourth in 1900.

Background

This was the second appearance of a team version of what would become (for individuals) standardised as the men's ISSF 50 meter pistol event. The team event was held 4 times, at every Summer Olympics from 1900 to 1920 (except 1904, when no shooting events were held).

Great Britain, Greece, Sweden, and the United States each made their debut in the event. Belgium, France, and the Netherlands made their second appearance, having previously competed in 1900. Reigning champion Switzerland did not return.

Competition format

The competition had each shooter fire 60 shots, in 10 series of 6 shots each, at a distance of 50 yards. The target was round, 50 centimetres in diameter, with 10 scoring rings. Scoring for each shot was up to 10 points, in increments of 1 point. The maximum individual score possible was 600 points, with a team maximum of 2400 points. Any revolver or pistol could be used; only open sights were allowed. Any ammunition with a metal cartridge case could be used. The individual and team events were separate, with scores not carrying over.

Schedule

Results

References

Sources
 
 

Men's pistol team free